Quanzhou bus station was a bus station in Quanzhou, Fujian, China.

History 
Quanzhou bus station opened in 1990. It was known as "Quanzhou new station" among locals. It closed on 20 December 2021 and the remaining four bus routes were transferred to Quanzhou transportation center. The bus station ticket hall was later used as a COVID-19 vaccination centre.

References 

Bus stations in China
Transport in Fujian